The 1928 Colorado Silver and Gold football team was an American football team that represented the University of Colorado as a member of the Rocky Mountain Conference (RMC) during the 1928 college football season. Led by ninth-year head coach Myron E. Witham, Colorado compiled an overall record of 5–1 with an identical mark in conference play, placing second in the RMC.

Schedule

References

Colorado
Colorado Buffaloes football seasons
Colorado Silver and Gold football